The Diocese of Umzimvubu is a relatively new Diocese created out of a portion of the former St John's See. It came into existence in 1991 and is  currently vacant after the ousting of bishop Mlibo Ngewu.

The Diocese of Umzimvubu sits on the border of Kwazulu Natal and The Eastern Cape, located in the northern area of the former homeland of the Transkei. Historically the Diocese, along with the Diocese of Mthatha, formed the larger Diocese of St John's. Consequently, it shares many of the characteristics of this neighbouring diocese.

List of bishops
Geoff Davies 1991-2003
Mlibo Ngewu 2003-2017
Vacant from September 2017 till present
Tsietsi Edward Seleoane, bishop elect, elected September 2019

Coat of arms 
The diocese registered a coat of arms at the Bureau of Heraldry in 1992 : Per fess  wavy  abaisse, Gules and Azure, a bar wavy abaisse Argent,  surmounted  by a Celtic cross Or; a chief dancetty Azure filleted Argent; the shield ensigned with a mitre proper.

Notes

1991 establishments in South Africa
Anglican Church of Southern Africa dioceses
Christian organizations established in 1991